The Chevrolet Series D is an American automobile produced by Chevrolet between 1917 and 1918. Over 4,000 Series D cars were manufactured in the 1918 model year, and it was the first Chevrolet car with a V8 engine. It was not until 1955 that Chevrolet made another V8.

Models
The series came in two body styles, a 4-door 5-passenger Touring Sedan Model D-4 and a 2-door 4-passenger Roadster Model D-5. The only difference between the Touring Sedan and the Roadster was the Roadster had a "dual-cowl" approach while the Touring sedan used four doors. According to documented records, the term "Chummy Roadster" was not mentioned but may have been a marketing term added later. The only standard color offered was Chevrolet Green with French-pleated leather interior. Both were equipped with a 20 gallon fuel tank installed in back. Mahogany was used for all visible woodwork and nickel plated brightwork. Both the touring sedan and roadster had a listed retail price of US$1,550 ($ in  dollars ) which made it a one year only product.

Details
The Series D internal combustion engine is a liquid-cooled, 288 cubic inch (4.7Litre) 90° design V8, designed and built by Chevrolet in 1917 and subsequently by General Motors Company's new Chevrolet Division (acquired as part of Chevrolet's 1917 takeover of, and merger into, GM) in 1917 and 1918. 

It is capable of producing  at 2700 rpm. This was Chevrolet's first V8 and one of the first overhead-valve V8 engines. Chevrolet would not produce another V8 until the debut of the Generation I small-block in 1955. This design had a partially exposed valvetrain (pushrods and lifters were visible) with a nickel-plated rocker cover, an aluminum water-cooled intake manifold. The starter is in the valley of the block, as well as the gear driven generator with the fan clutch coming off of it. The gear driven generator runs the distributor as well. The belt in the front drove only the water pump. It had a  flywheel and a counterbalanced crankshaft.

The existence of the Chevrolet V8 which used overhead valves coincides with the Cadillac Type 51 flathead V8 and the Oldsmobile Light Eight flathead that were also sold at the same time, while the Chevrolet Series 490 and Series FA used an overhead valve four-cylinder engine. GM companion division Buick offered both the Buick Four and the Buick Six that exclusively used overhead valves in an inline engine configuration.

See also 
Cadillac Type 51
Buick Six
Oldsmobile Light Eight
Oldsmobile Model 42
Oakland

References

Chevrolet engines
Series D